Lakshya is a 2021 Indian Telugu-language sports drama film written and directed by Dheerendra Santhossh Jagarlapudi. It is produced by Sri Venkateswara Cinemas and Northstar Entertainment. The film stars Naga Shaurya, Jagapathi Babu, Ketika Sharma and Sachin Khedekar. The film was released on 10 December 2021.

Plot 
Pardhu is a gifted archer since his childhood. His grandfather notices it and spends all his earnings to admit him in Hyderabad's best archery academy. Pardhu's exemplary performance helps him easily become the state champion. He falls in love with Rithika. Pardhu becomes depressed due to the sudden demise of his grandfather and becomes addicted to drugs. He eventually realizes that someone planned his downfall and introduced him to drugs through his friends. In a subsequent fight, they break his hand and he falls unconscious. However, he reaches the stadium in time to participate in finals but falls unconscious. He gets suspended after failing in Narcotics test, and breaks up with Rithika when he thrashes her father. After losing everything in his life, Parthu becomes an alcoholic but Parthasaradhi enters his life who motivates him to fight back. Pardhu trains hard with the hope that someday his right hand would work. He reunites with Rithika and prepares to participate in World Championship. He learns a shocking truth that his right hand will never fully recover. But Parthasaradhi enlightens him that his left hand is equally competent for archery and he need to train his mind to cope with it. Pardhu convinces the board and participates in World championship. He finally wins a medal fulfilling his grandfather's dream.

Cast 
 Naga Shaurya as Pardhu
 Jagapathi Babu as Parthasaradhi
 Ketika Sharma as Rithika
 Satya Sai Srinivas as Rithika’s father
 Sachin Khedekar as Pardhu's grandfather
 Shatru as Rahul
 Satya as Pardhu's friend
 Ravi Prakash
 Kireeti Damaraju

Production 
The film was tentatively titled as NS20. On 30 November 2020, the film's official title was unveiled as Lakshya. Principal photography of the film began on 16 September 2020 and was wrapped up on 30 August 2021.

Music 
Soundtrack album and background score of the film is composed by Kaala Bhairava.

Reception 
Thadhagath Pathi of The Times of India rated 3/5 and called Lakshya "an interesting sports drama with minor flaws." In addition to the performances, Pathi appreciated the directed for not dwelling into "jingoism or unnecessary commercial elements." While praising Shaurya's acting and archery backdrop, Sangeetha Devi Dundoo of The Hindu wrote, "The film moves at a snail’s pace and predictable lines; the only engaging factor is archery, a sport we haven’t explored in films." In another mixed review, The New Indian Express critic Ram Venkat Srikar stated: "Lakshya surely has the focus, but like the protagonist, who falls prey to substance abuse, the script too falls prey to predictability."

References 
2020s Telugu-language films
2021 drama films
Indian sports drama films
Films scored by Kaala Bhairava

External links 

2021 films